Nicola Ciotti (born 5 October 1976 in Rimini) is an Italian high jumper. He is the twin brother of Giulio Ciotti.

Biography
He finished fifth at the 2005 World Championships and sixth at the 2006 European Championships. He also competed at the European Indoor Championships in 2002, 2005, 2007 and 2009, the World Championships in 2003, 2005 and 2007 as well as the 2004 Olympic Games and the 2006 World Indoor Championships without reaching the final.

Ciotti became Italian high jump champion in 2005, triumphing over Giulio Ciotti, Andrea Bettinelli, and Alessandro Talotti in those efforts. He also became indoor champion in 2002, 2005 and 2006.

His personal best jump is 2.30 metres, achieved in July 2003 in Viersen, and then equalled twice since. He has 2.31 metres on the indoor track, achieved in January 2006 in Hustopece, at the same competition as his brother jumped the same height for his personal best. On 9 February 2011, almost 35, jumping 2.28 at the meeting in Banska Bystrica, gets the minimum for participation in the 2011 European Athletics Indoor Championships in Paris.

Achievements

National titles
He has won 6 times the individual national championship.
2 wins in High jump (2005, 2009)
4 wins in High jump indoor (2002, 2005, 2006, 2011)

See also
Italian all-time top lists - High jump

References

External links
 

1976 births
Living people
Sportspeople from Rimini
Italian male high jumpers
Athletes (track and field) at the 2004 Summer Olympics
Olympic athletes of Italy
Italian twins
Twin sportspeople
World Athletics Championships athletes for Italy
Athletics competitors of Centro Sportivo Carabinieri
Athletes (track and field) at the 2005 Mediterranean Games
Mediterranean Games competitors for Italy
20th-century Italian people
21st-century Italian people